Founding Emperor of Ming Dynasty is a Chinese television series based on the life of Zhu Yuanzhang, the founding emperor of the Ming dynasty. Directed by Feng Xiaoning and starring Hu Jun as the emperor, the series was first aired on CCTV in China in 2006.

Plot
Turmoil engulfs China in the final years of the Mongol-ruled Yuan dynasty as the government degenerates into corruption while rebel forces sprout throughout the land to overthrow the Yuan regime. Somewhere in the wilderness, Zhu Chongba, a young cowherd, stands on a huge rock and proclaims to his friends, "I, Emperor Zhu, will reward each of you with a large piece of rice cake when I ascend the throne one day!" Around the same time, his parents died of starvation at home.

To give his parents a proper funeral, Zhu becomes a novice monk at a local monastery and spends part of his childhood there. A few years later, the monastery is destroyed so he has no choice but to become a beggar. One day, he encounters Yuan soldiers and narrowly escapes death, but is captured by some rebels, who suspect that he is a spy and want to kill him. At this critical moment, he is saved by a girl, and he joins Guo Zixing's rebel army later.

Zhu Chongba proves his capability on the battlefield and wins the favour of Guo Zixing. Guo gives Zhu Chongba a new name, "Yuanzhang", and arranges for his goddaughter, Lady Ma, to marry Zhu. From then on, Zhu Yuanzhang starts his journey towards becoming an emperor. He earns the support of talented men, such as Xu Da, Chang Yuchun, Lan Yu, Li Shanchang and Liu Bowen, triumphs over his nemesis Chen Youliang at the Battle of Lake Poyang, overthrows the Yuan Dynasty, and finally establishes the Ming dynasty.

Zhu Yuanzhang initiated a beginning for a golden era of China under the reigns of his successors. He implemented land reforms to prevent peasants from being abused by wealthy landlords and bureaucrats; harshly punished officials found guilty of corruption; drafted the Code of the Great Ming; introduced policies to help the country recover from the effects of war. However, he also used ruthless and brutal means to consolidate power: he killed some of his subjects who had contributed greatly to the founding of his empire for fear that they would rebel against him.

Cast

 Hu Jun as Zhu Yuanzhang
 Zhou Ti as Zhu Yuanzhang (teenager)
 Ju Xue as Empress Ma
 Yin Guohua as Hu Weiyong
 Zheng Xiaoning as Liu Bowen
 Chen Changhai as Li Shanchang
 Ebusi Yonglin as Xu Da
 Yang Hongwu as Tang He
 Hou Xiangling as Zhu Biao
 Zhou Zhengbo as Yang Xian
 Qian Yifei as Song Lian
 Xu Shouxin as Lü Xu
 Zeng Ang as Lan Yu
 Li Haifeng as Chang Yuchun
 Yao Changjiang as Erhu
 Bobo Gan as Yu'er
 Chen Ming as Liu Lian
 Wang Yuzhang as Guo Zixing
 Lü Yiding as Guo Tianxu
 Bao Depan as Sun Deya
 Li Ming as Chen Youliang
 Yao Yuxing as Chen Li
 Gao Huailiang as Zhang Shicheng
 Li Jieni as Han Lin'er
 Tu Men as Toqto'a
 Liu Dong as Dahu
 Zhou Yang as Li Jin
 Zheng Jie as Wu Feng
 Ren Suyun as Ma Sandao
 Ran Weiqun as Lu Mingyi
 Gao Sen as Master Peng
 Yang Si as Qian'er
 Zhang Xueying as Qing'er (Xiaoqing)
 Zhou Junhao as Zhu Yunwen
 Qian Lin as Zhu Di

Releases
The series was released in Japan under the title 大明帝国 朱元璋 in a three box DVD set.

See also
 Chuanqi Huangdi Zhu Yuanzhang

External links
  Founding Emperor of Ming Dynasty on Sina.com
  Founding Emperor of Ming Dynasty on xinhuanet.com
  Founding Emperor of Ming Dynasty plot synopsis
  Founding Emperor of Ming Dynasty official website on Chinese Drama Legend

2006 Chinese television series debuts
Television series set in the Yuan dynasty
Television series set in the Ming dynasty
Television shows about rebels
Mandarin-language television shows
China Central Television original programming
Chinese historical television series
Television series set in the 14th century
Television shows written by Zhu Sujin